Montana Sky is a 2007 American television film directed by Mike Robe and starring Ashley Williams, John Corbett, and Charlotte Ross. Based on the 1996 Nora Roberts novel of the same name, the film is about a wealthy stock dealer who bequeaths his Montana farm to his three daughters, provided they live on the ranch together for at least one year. Montana Sky is part of the Nora Roberts 2007 movie collection, which also includes Angels Fall, Blue Smoke, and Carolina Moon. The movie debuted on February 5, 2007 on Lifetime.

Plot
Half-sisters Willa, Tess, and Lily Mercy are left their wealthy father's multimillion-dollar estate, including his Montana ranch, after his death. The only stipulation is that the women will have to live with each other for a year.

Having never previously met, the three sisters, who have very different personalities, agree to the strange situation (mostly because each of their 1/3rd share is worth eight million dollars), despite having reservations about their forced family 'reunion'. The biggest problem the women face, however, is the discovery of a saboteur in their midst.

It seems that when their father died, he left some bitter enemies behind, enemies who would love to see his daughters fail. Now, in order to get what is rightfully theirs, the three siblings will have to work harder than ever before to clean up the mess their father left behind.

During their trial, all three find love, and realize that maybe their situation wasn't such a bad thing after all.

Cast
 Ashley Williams as Willa Mercy
 John Corbett as Ben McKinnon
 Charlotte Ross as Tess Mercy
 Diane Ladd as Bess
 Laura Mennell as Lily Mercy
 Nathaniel Arcand as Adam Wolfchild
 Aaron Pearl as Nate Torrence
 Tom Carey as Jim
 Scott Heindl as Jesse Carne
 James Baker as Ham
 Donovan Workun as Pickles
 Stephen Hair as Ken Campbell
 James D. Hopkin as Preacher
 Heather Lea MacCallum as Coroner
 James Dugan as Vet

Production
The film was executive produced by Stephanie Germain and Peter Guber, who also executive produced seven other Roberts films for Lifetime in 2007 and 2009. Though set in Montana, the film was actually shot in the provinces of Alberta and British Columbia, Canada.

References

External links
 
 
 

2007 television films
2007 films
Films based on American novels
Films based on works by Nora Roberts
Films set in Montana
Lifetime (TV network) films
2007 romantic drama films
American romantic drama films
American drama television films
American thriller television films
Films directed by Mike Robe
Films scored by Steve Porcaro
2000s English-language films
2000s American films